38th Brigade may refer to:

 38th Guards Air Assault Brigade, a unit of the Special Forces of Belarus
 38 Canadian Brigade Group, a unit of the Canadian Army
 38th Indian Infantry Brigade, a unit of the British Indian Army
 38th Independent Mixed Brigade (Imperial Japanese Army)
 38th Guards Communications Brigade, a unit of the Russian Airborne Forces
 38th Brigade (United Kingdom)
 38th (Irish) Brigade, United Kingdom
 38th Light Anti-Aircraft Brigade (United Kingdom)
 38th Air Defense Artillery Brigade (United States)
 38th Sustainment Brigade, a unit of the United States Army

See also
 38th Division (disambiguation)
 38th Regiment (disambiguation)
 38th Wing (disambiguation)
 38 Squadron (disambiguation)